Cobra is a 2022 Indian Tamil-language psychological action thriller film written and directed by R. Ajay Gnanamuthu and produced by S. S. Lalit Kumar, under the banner 7 Screen Studio. The film stars Vikram in double role alongside Irfan Pathan, Roshan Mathew, Srinidhi Shetty, Mirnalini Ravi, Miya George, Sarjano Khalid, K. S. Ravikumar, Anandaraj, Robo Shankar and Meenakshi Govindarajan play supporting roles. It also marked the cinematic debut of Indian cricketer Irfan Pathan, and the Tamil debuts of Srinidhi Shetty, Sarjano Khalid and Roshan Mathew. The music is composed by A. R. Rahman, with cinematography handled by Harish Kannan and edited by John Abraham and Bhuvan Srinivasan. In the film, Interpol officer Aslan Yilmas is assigned to catch a mysterious assassin named Cobra, who assassinates people using mathematical skills.

The project was officially announced in May 2019, under the tentative title Vikram 58, before the official title was announced that December. Filming began in October 2019 and nearly took three years due to the impact of COVID-19 pandemic on film shootings, travel restrictions and Vikram's commitments on other projects, effectively delaying the initial May 2020 release plans. It was primarily shot in Chennai, while filming also took place in Kerala, Kolkata and Russia.

Cobra was theatrically released on 31 August 2022, coinciding with Vinayaka Chathurthi. The film was a box-office bomb and received polarizing reviews from critics and audience, who praised Vikram's performance, concept, cinematography, music and background score but the pacing, length, convoluted writing and some characters received criticism.

Plot 
A Turkish Interpol officer, Aslan Yilmaz investigates the assassinations of Chief Minister of Odisha, Mayor of France and Prince of Scotland, where he, along with a young Tamil criminologist Judith Samson, deduce that Cobra, a flawless assassin is the mastermind behind the assassinations. The duo learn that Cobra assassinates his targets using mathematical skills, leading them to believe that he is a professor of mathematics.

Meanwhile, Mathiyazhagan "Mathi" is a mathematics professor, who is actually Cobra, receives his next assignment from his mentor and senior journalist in Kolkata, Nellaiappan. He is to kill the Russia's defence minister, Dmitri Yugolsav. He travels to Russia and manages to successfully assassinate him and escape, despite tight security from the Interpol. Before Yugolsav was killed, Aslan and his team watches a telecasted conversation between Nellaiappan and Nawab, who works at a company named Rishi Corporation, where he concludes that the victims are connected to the company's owner Rajeev Rishi, a psychotic and sadistic business magnate, who inherited the company from his father. After his engagement to his criminologist girlfriend and Judith's teacher, Bhavana Menon, Mathi learns that Nellaippan has been kidnapped and learns that someone has targeting him from the beginning of his assignments. 

After a clue from Sudoku, Mathi receives a call from the person, who is Mathi's doppelganger, where he challenges Mathi to save himself from him. In a turns of events, it is revealed that the person who is referred to as Mathi is actually Kathir, Mathi's schizophrenic long-lost twin brother and the person who challenged Kathir is the real Mathi. Rishi sends men to capture Mathi, but Kathir manages to kill them. Mathi had been holding a grudge against Kathir, as he was responsible for the death of his girlfriend, Jennifer Rosario, who was the daughter of the Kolkata city commissioner Rosario. Mathi learnt about Kathir's identity as Cobra and planned to seek vengeance for Jennifer's death, where he reveals that he was the one who was sending clues about the assassinations to the Interpol. 

Mathi hands over Kathir to Aslan, where Anand Subramaniam, the investigating officer and Rishi's mole, takes Kathir's help to capture Mathi. Kathir brings them to Mathi's hideout which is an under-constructed mall. Rishi arrives and a fight ensues between the gang and Kathir, where he successfully manages to subdue them. Mathi confronts Kathir about Jennifer's death. Kathir reveals that he had arranged for Mathi and Jennifer to leave for Bangladesh, but her father and relatives followed and killed her. After clearing the misunderstanding, Kathir reveals that he had killed Jennifer's relatives and locks Mathi in a room. Kathir then kills Rishi and his men single-handedly but gets shot and succumbs to his injuries leaving Mathi and Bhavana devastated.

Cast

Production

Development 
In May 2019, Producer S. S. Lalit Kumar of 7 Screen Studio and Viacom18 Studios announced their upcoming project featuring Vikram, tentatively titled as Vikram 58. The film is directed by R. Ajay Gnanamuthu, who previously helmed Demonte Colony (2015) and Imaikkaa Nodigal (2018). It was intended to be a pan-Indian film, set for release in five languages, during the summer in April 2020. By July 2019, A. R. Rahman was roped in to score the music for the film. Stunt choreographer Dhilip Subbarayan and cinematographer Sivakumar Vijayan, were reported to be a part of the technical team. Vijayan was later replaced by debutant Harish Kannan. A report from The New Indian Express, dated 2 August 2019, stated that Vikram will be seen in 25 different looks.

In December, Viacom18 backed out of the project due to unknown reasons, and Lalit Kumar was credited as the sole producer. While it was rumoured to be titled as Amar, the makers cleared the rumours by announcing the official title as Cobra on 25 December 2019. The team titled the film "Cobra" because it resembles the pivotal character of snake cobra. Gnanamuthu, further revealed in an interview to The Times of India, saying "The character of protagonist and cobra has a link. If I reveal anything more now, it will give away too many details. Also, since the film is made in Tamil, Kannada, Malayalam, Telugu and Hindi I wanted a title that works in all languages. Hence, we zeroed in on Cobra." Speaking to Ananda Vikatan, Gnanamuthu described Cobra as a multi-genre film and revolves around various genres such as psychological, science fiction, thriller and action. Vikram's character was revealed to be a mathematician and a "shape-shifter", who uses mathematics for criminal activities.

Casting 

Initially, Priya Bhavani Shankar was cast as the film's female lead. Due to unknown reasons, Priya opted out of the project and the makers finalised Srinidhi Shetty, of K.G.F fame, to play the female lead in late October 2019. This film marks her debut in Tamil film industry. Former Indian cricketer Irfan Pathan signed to play a pivotal role in the project. This also marks his debut in Indian film industry. Gnanamuthu, had watched several of his TikTok videos, and impressed by his acting stints he met Pathan at his house in Vadodara, Gujarat, who later agreed to be a part of the film. On his birthday, the team revealed his look and character name as Aslan Yilmaz, an Interpol agent. In late-October, filmmaker K. S. Ravikumar joined the cast and shot for few days. Gnanamuthu stated that his character will be a "complex one" and "quite integral to the script".

In January 2020, Mirnalini Ravi was roped in to the cast, and in the same month Robo Shankar also joined as one of the supporting actors. Ajay Gnanamuthu chose to sign Shane Nigam for an important role in this flick, after being impressed by his performance in Kumbalangi Nights (2019). However, the Kerala Film Producers Association (KFPA), had written to the South Indian Film Chamber of Commerce (SIFC), requesting a ban on the actor until he pays the producers of two of his cancelled films. Sarjano Khalid was brought in as the film's replacement. Theater personality Mohammad Ali Baig, was also roped in for the flick in February 2020. In April 2020, Malayalam actors Roshan Mathew, Miya, and Mamukkoya were included in the film's cast.

Filming 

While the film's principal photography was supposed to begin on 21 September 2019, it actually started on 4 October 2019 in Chennai. While Irfan Pathan joined the sets of the shoot on 15 October, Srinidhi Shetty joined it only at the end of the month. The former had finished the first schedule of the film on 6 November 2019 in Chennai. On 11 November 2019, Vikram and his team headed to Alleppey for a song shoot, which was wrapped up within two days. By the end of November 2019, the second schedule of filming was completed in Kerala. The third schedule of the film took place in Chennai in December 2019. The makers planned to shoot a few sequences across Russia and Europe in January 2020. Meanwhile, on 17 January, the makers headed to Kolkata to prepare for the third schedule. Irfan Pathan completed his portions for the flick on 21 January, during the fourth schedule. On 6 February, the makers planned to shoot the climax sequence in Russia. On 7 February 2020, the makers shot a crucial sequence at the Ramee Mall in Chennai.

Vikram and Gnanamuthu began filming in Russia in March 2020, despite fears that Coronavirus might spread. A rapid spread of COVID-19 forced the crew to halt filming and return to India. The film's shoot was further affected due to the COVID-19 pandemic, as 25% of the shoot is pending as of March 2020. Ajay Gnanamuthu announced he would take a pay cut for the film, in order to help producers during these challenging times. The lack of international travel facilities made it impossible for the team to shoot in Russia, so they created huge sets resembling the country in Chennai. The team began dubbing the film in October 2020. The filming resumed on 3 December 2020 in Chennai, with Vikram joining the sets. After completing the schedule, the team traveled to Kolkata on 22 December 2020. However, since Vikram is also involved in the shooting of Ponniyin Selvan during mid-January 2021, the team decided to shoot a few scenes without Vikram and the production team stated that the actor would join the shoot once his portions were completed. Whereas, Srinidhi Shetty completed her shoot on 7 February 2021.

Director Ajay Gnanamuthu was unsatisfied with the portions shot on the sets, so the team decided to go back to Russia in mid-February 2021, despite the cold weather. On 22 February 2021, Vikram joined the film's shoot in Moscow, where the final portions of the film were being filmed. Irfan Pathan joined them on 26 February 2021. The team filmed a few scenes at Saint Petersburg State University on 2 March 2021 as part of their final schedule. The team completed the major portions of the film on 5 March 2021. Shooting has been delayed apparently, due to Vikram's commitments with Karthik Subbaraj's directorial Mahaan (2022) produced by the same production company 7 Screen Studio and the subsequent lock-down implemented by the government to curb the second wave of the pandemic. After the shooting of Mahaan was wrapped, the team restarted production on 15 August 2021, with the commencement of a minor schedule in Kolkata. After the producer's parallel projects and Vikram's other commitments, the team started its final schedule in Chennai on 24 November 2021 and continued for a month. On 14 February 2022, Gnanamuthu tweeted that the filming has been completely wrapped.

Music 

The film's music was composed by A. R. Rahman marking his first collaboration with director Ajay Gnanamuthu. It is also his fourth film starring Vikram after Pudhiya Mannargal (1994), Raavanan (2010) and I (2015). The songs for the film featured lyrics written by Thamarai, Pa. Vijay and Vivek. The first single titled "Thumbi Thullal" released on 22 June 2020. It was written by Vivek and sung by Nakul Abhyankar, Shreya Ghoshal. The second single titled "Adheeraa" was released on 15 April 2022. It was written by Pa. Vijay and sung by Vagu Mazan. The third single titled "Uyir Uruguthey" was released on 4 July 2022. The audio launch was held at Phoenix Marketcity, Chennai on 15 July 2022, featuring the cast and crew in attendance and the songs were performed live by Rahman and his musical team.

Release

Theatrical 
Cobra was released in theaters on 31 August 2022. The film was originally scheduled for a release coinciding with the Eid al-Fitr weekend, falling on 22 May 2020, which was postponed due to the COVID-19 pandemic in India. In March 2021, it has been said that the post-production of the film might take a longer-time than planned and many sequences had to be re-shot, since Ajay Gnanamuthu was disappointed on shooting the Russia schedule by replicating terrains, rather than filming in real locations, which he felt was "not authentic", irrespective of the difficulties faced by travel restrictions due to COVID-19 pandemic. During the production, Seven Screen Studios had refuted claims of releasing on a streaming platform, and re-assured the plans of theatrical release. It has been stated that this film will be released after Lalit Kumar's another production with Vikram, the Karthik Subbaraj-directorial Mahaan (2022). In May 2022, the film was set to be released on 11 August 2022, during the Independence Day weekend. Due to post-production delays, the film was released on 31 August 2022, coinciding with Vinayagar Chathurthi. The film received negative response due to its three-hour duration, where it led to release a trimmed version on 1 September 2022.

Distribution 
The distribution rights of the film in Tamil Nadu, have been acquired by Red Giant Movies. The Andhra Pradesh and Telangana distribution rights have been acquired by NVR Cinemas. The Kerala distribution rights were acquired by Iffaar Media and Dream Big Films. The distribution rights of the film in UK and Europe have been acquired by Ahimsa Entertainment.

Home media 
The satellite rights of the Tamil version are owned by Kalaignar TV, while digital streaming rights are through SonyLIV. The film was digitally streamed on SonyLIV from 28 September 2022.

Reception

Critical response 
Cobra received mixed-to-negative reviews from critics and audience.

M Suganth of The Times of India rated the film 2.5 out of 5 stars and wrote "Cobra is the kind of an overwrought, overlong, over-indulgent, overloud and over-the-top action entertainer that is made in an old-fashioned way". Janani K of India Today rated the film 2 out of 5 stars and wrote "Cobra is an underwhelming watch that solely relies on Chiyaan Vikram's acting chops". Manoj Kumar R of The Indian Express rated the film 2 out of 5 stars and wrote "Cobra is about a globetrotting assassin with a deep fascination for cosplay would be a lot of fun to watch if made properly. After ramping up the initial excitement, the film sinks". Sowmya Rajendran of The News Minute rated the film 2 out of 5 stars and wrote "This bizarre action thriller directed by Ajay Gnanamuthu tries very hard to be clever, but is filled with carelessness in the scripting".

Haricharan Pudipeddi of Hindustan Times stated "Cobra could've been a far more effective thriller if it wasn't so long. It could've also done away with the highly boring romantic track, which hardly helps in keeping the audiences engaged". Bhuvanesh Chandar of The Hindu wrote "Looking back at it, you only feel bad that yet another film becomes an average outing for an actor who gives his all." Pinkvilla rated the film 2.5 out of 5 and wrote "Roshan Mathew portrayal of the character Rishi a corporate leader, make 'Cobra' feel like a regular Kollywood masala actioner and not a story that needs to be heard. Avinash Ramachandran of Cinema Express gave the film 2.5 out of 5 stars and wrote "Cobra ticks almost all the boxes we have recently come to expect from a Vikram-starrer, including the disappointment of the actor being the brightest star in a rather middling film."

S Subhakeertana of OTT Play rated the film 2 out of 5 stars and wrote "Cobra is a mediocre film that struggles to be both a compelling swashbuckling adventure as well as a moving drama." Felix Kingsley of Movie Herald rated the film 2.5 out of 5 and stated "The new treatment makes this well-known template partly engaging." Jayadeep Jayesh of Deccan Herald gave the film's rating 2 out of 5, stating that "The tone at which the film is pitched does not allow A R Rahman to display his musical prowess. The title track is catchy but the rest of the album is forgettable."

Box office 
After three days of its release, the film made a box office collection of  crore worldwide.

Notes

References

External links 
 

Indian action thriller films
2020s Tamil-language films
Films scored by A. R. Rahman
Films postponed due to the COVID-19 pandemic
Films shot in Russia
Films shot in Kerala
Films shot in Chennai
Indian heist films
2022 films
2022 action thriller films
2022 crime action films
Films set in Moscow
Films about twin brothers
Twins in Indian films